Joel L. Shin was a specialist in international trade matters, government affairs and national defense.  He was a partner at Evenflow Macro, which he cofounded in 2013.  He had previously been a principal of The Scowcroft Group and a senior fellow with The Forum for International Policy.  Shin served on the policy staff of the presidential campaign of Governor George W. Bush, assisting in the development of foreign and defense policies.  Shin also worked for the Bush-Cheney transition.  He was also an associate in the corporate department of Whitman Breed, Abbott & Morgan, a New York law firm, where his focus included mergers and acquisitions in the defense and high-tech industries.

Shin received his undergraduate, law, and Master of Public Policy degrees from Harvard University. For his 1990 undergraduate graduation he delivered the Latin oration at the combined undergraduate and graduate commencement. Shin also received a Master of Philosophy degree from the University of Oxford, where he was a Rhodes Scholar.

Shin suffered a heart attack and died at his home in Arlington, Virginia on January 21, 2014.

References

External links
The Forum For International Policy Brief "Kazakhstan: A Growing Relationship?" - Joel L. Shin  Dec 18, 2001
The Forum For International Policy Commentary "On the March: In Defense of Foreign Aid" - Joel L. Shin April 2, 2002
National Review "On the March In defense of foreign aid" - By Joel Shin  April 2, 2002
USINPAC Holds Historic Bush-Cheney Campaign Policy Briefing - USINPAC - Washington, D.C., July 28, 2004.

American political consultants
Harvard Law School alumni
Alumni of the University of Oxford
2014 deaths
Year of birth missing
Harvard Kennedy School alumni